The  is a railway line in western Japan, which connects Kyoto and Shimonoseki, Yamaguchi, operated by West Japan Railway Company (JR West). It is the major railway line of the San'in region, approximately paralleling the Japan Sea, crossing Kyoto, Hyōgo, Tottori, Shimane, and Yamaguchi prefectures.

The section between Kyoto and Sonobe, connecting Kyoto and its northern suburbs, is a part of JR West's Urban Network and is nicknamed the Sagano Line.

Basic data
Distances: 
Operators
West Japan Railway Company (Category 1)
Kyoto - Hatabu: 
Nagatoshi - Senzaki: 
Japan Freight Railway Company (Category 2)
Hōki-Daisen - Higashi-Matsue: 
Yonago - Higashi-Matsue temporary closed
Okami - Masuda: 
Track:
Double: Kyoto – Sonobe, Ayabe – Fukuchiyama, Hōki-Daisen – Yasugi, Higashi-Matsue – Matsue, Tamatsukuri-Onsen – Kimachi
Single: the rest
Electric supply:
Kyoto – Kinosaki-Onsen, Hōki-Daisen – Nishi-Izumo: 1,500 V DC
Railway signalling:
Kyoto – Nishi-Izumo: Automatic
Nishi-Izumo – Hatabu, including "Senzaki branch line": Special Automatic; a simplified automatic system
Maximum speed in service: 
Kyoto – Saga-Arashiyama: 
Saga-Arashiyama – Umahori: 
Umahori – Ayabe: 
Ayabe – Fukuchiyama: 
Fukuchiyama – Tottori: 
Tottori – Izumoshi: 
Izumoshi – Masuda: 
Masuda – Hatabu: 
Nagatoshi – Senzaki:

Stations

From Kyoto to Sonobe (Sagano Line)

Stations on this segment
 - Umekōji-Kyōtonishi -  -  -  -  -  -  -  -  -  -  -  -  -  -

From Sonobe to Kinosaki-Onsen
This section is designated the letter "E".

Rapid trains are operated as local trains and stop at every station between Sonobe and Fukuchiyama.

From Kinosaki-Onsen to Yonago 
This section is designated the letter "A".

From Yonago to Masuda
This section is designated the letter "D".
 TL: 
 AL: 
 CL: 
All the trains stop at stations signed "+". Most trains stop at "‡". Most trains do not stop at "*". No trains (other than local) stop at "-".
Rapid Commuter Liner runs from Nishi-Izumo to Yonago, one direction alone

From Masuda to Shimonoseki

Senzaki Branch Line

History
The line was built by three different private companies, which were subsequently nationalised and connected by the Japanese Government Railway (JGR). The Kyoto Railway opened the section to Sonobe between 1897 and 1899. The Bantsuru Railway opened the Ayabe to Fukuchiyama section (as part of the current Maizuru Line) in 1904. Both companies were nationalised in 1907.

The first section opened by the JGR was between Yonago and Mikuriya in 1902, and the line was then progressively extended eastward, reaching Tottori in 1907 and Iwami in 1908, the same year the current Bantan Line opened to Wadayama and Yoka. Construction of that line continued westward, and the two lines were connected in 1912. In the meantime, the Sonobe to Ayabe section was opened in 1910, and the Fukuchiyama to Wadayama section the following year. In addition, construction from Yonago progressed westward, opening to Matsue in 1908 and Izumoshi in 1910, resulting in the  continuous line upon the 1912 connection mentioned above. At the western end, the Choshu Railway opened the Hatabu to Kogushi section in 1914.

From Izumoshi, construction continued progressively westward, opening to Masuda in 1923, and to Todakobama in 1925, the year that the Choshu Railway was nationalised and the Kogushi to Takibe section opened, with construction then continuing from both directions until the two sections were connected in 1933, completing the current line.

Double-tracking
The Yonago to Hoki-Daisen section was double-tracked between 1962 and 1966, with the Ayabe to Fukuchiyama section double-tracked in between 1968 and 1969, and the Tamatsukuri-Onsen to Kimachi section in 1970. The Matsue to Higashi-Matsue section was double-tracked in 1979, and the Yonago to Yasugi section in 1980. The original Saga-Arashiyama to Umahori section was built on the banks of the Hozugawa in a narrow gorge. A new double-track alignment was opened in 1989, and the original alignment became the Sagano Scenic Railway. Further double-tracking occurred in stages, with the entire Kyoto to Sonobe section double-tracked by 2010.

Electrification
The Hoki-Daisen to Izumoshi section was electrified in 1982 in conjunction with the electrification of the Hakubi Line. The Fukuchiyama to Kinosaki section was electrified in 1986 in conjunction with the electrification of the Fukuchiyama Line. The Sonobe to Fukuchiyama section was electrified between 1985 and 1986, and the Kyoto to Sonobe section in 1990.

Former connecting lines

 Fukuchiyama Station: The Hokutan Railway operated a  line to Koumori between 1923 and 1971.
 Ebara Station: The Izushi Railway operated an  line to Izushi between 1929 and 1970.
 Iwami Station: The Iwai Prefectural Government opened a   gauge line to Iwai Onsen in 1925. In June 1934, 149 of the 216 buildings at Iwai Onsen burnt down, and then in September that year Typhoon Muroto caused such extensive damage to the line that it was out of service until February 1936. In 1944, the line was closed and materials recycled for the Japanese war effort.
 Kurayoshi Station: In 1912, a  line to Kamii opened, and was extended  to Sekigane in 1941 and a further  (as a passenger-only section) to Yamamori in 1958. Freight services ceased in 1974 and the line closed in 1985.
 Yonago Station: The Hakuhi Electric Railway operated a  line, electrified at 600 V DC, to Hosshoji between 1924 and 1967. A  electrified branch from Aga to Mori operated between 1930 and 1944.
 Arashima Station: The Hirose Railway opened an  line, electrified at 600 V DC to Izumo Hirose in 1928. In 1954, the company merged with the Ichibata Electric Railway, and the line closed in 1960.
 Izumoshi Station: On the northern side of the station, the  Taisha Line opened in 1912, on the opposite bank of the Ogamogawa to the Izumo-Taisha Station on the Ichibata Electric Railway line. Freight services ceased in 1974, and the line closed in 1990.
 Gotsu Station: The Sanko Line operated 1930 - 2018.
 Nishi-Hamada Station: A  freight-only line to Hamada Minato to service the port operated between 1955 and 1982.
 Hatabu Station: The Choshu Railway opened a  line from Higashi-Mozeki to Kogushi in 1914. A proposed extension to Nagato was not built due to funding constraints. However, the line was electrified at 600 V DC in 1926. The company merged with the Sanyo Electric Railway in 1928, and the line closed in 1971.

References
This article incorporates material from the corresponding article in the Japanese Wikipedia.

 
Railway lines opened in 1897
1067 mm gauge railways in Japan